"Eloise" is the 51st episode of the HBO original series The Sopranos and the 12th of the show's fourth season. Written by Terence Winter and directed by James Hayman, it originally aired on December 1, 2002.

Starring
 James Gandolfini as Tony Soprano
 Lorraine Bracco as Dr. Jennifer Melfi *
 Edie Falco as Carmela Soprano
 Michael Imperioli as Christopher Moltisanti *
 Dominic Chianese as Corrado Soprano, Jr. 
 Steven Van Zandt as Silvio Dante
 Tony Sirico as Paulie Gualtieri
 Robert Iler as Anthony Soprano, Jr. 
 Jamie-Lynn Sigler as Meadow Soprano
 Drea de Matteo as Adriana La Cerva *
 Aida Turturro as Janice Soprano *
 Federico Castelluccio as Furio Giunta
 John Ventimiglia as Artie Bucco
 Vincent Curatola as Johnny Sack
 Steven R. Schirripa as Bobby Baccalieri

* = credit only

Guest starring

Synopsis

At Junior's trial, Bobby carefully chooses a juror who wears a wedding ring. Eugene and Dogsy intimidate him with carefully chosen words.

Little Carmine returns to New Jersey to talk to Carmine and Johnny about reducing their claim on Tony for a share of the HUD scam. Carmine will not bend. Johnny later meets Tony and Silvio and offers a minor compromise; Tony rejects it and orders Little Paulie, who takes two others with him, to vandalize Carmine's new restaurant. Carmine uses his union influence to shut down work at the warehouse project. Tony decides to wait the dispute out, expecting the financial losses on both sides will quickly force Carmine into a compromise. Johnny and Tony meet in secret; Johnny says Carmine's decisions lighten his pockets and, to Tony's astonishment, obliquely suggests that they collaborate to kill him.

Paulie has an angry confrontation with Silvio, who tells him his earnings are low and Tony is beginning to doubt his loyalty. He runs into Carmine and greets him effusively; he is shocked as he realizes that Carmine has no idea who he is. He learns that his mother's friend Minn keeps all her savings under her mattress. He breaks into her house thinking she is out, but she stumbles upon him in her bedroom, and he suffocates her with a pillow. He goes to Tony and gives him a large envelope of cash. They smile at each other, on good terms again.

Carmela visits Furio's house, alone, to discuss decorating; it seems they are going to kiss, but they are interrupted by one of her father's contractors. They make a "date" to choose the tiles of the house together. With Tony and other members of the crew, Furio visits an Indian casino in Connecticut. While most of the others carouse, he stands aloof. Later, as the drunken crew prepare to board the casino's helicopter for the flight home, Furio grabs Tony and appears barely able to restrain himself from shoving him into the spinning tail rotor. He tells the baffled Tony he was standing too close to the blades. The next morning, he does not come to collect Tony, who cannot clearly remember what happened the previous evening.

Furio has abruptly returned to Italy. Tony complains that he has lost one of his key men. Carmela becomes unhappy and bad-tempered. A family dinner to meet Meadow's new boyfriend, Finn DeTrolio, dispirits her. She is shocked by the notion that there are homosexual themes in Billy Budd, the book A.J. is studying, and argues about it with Meadow and her roommates. The antagonism spills over into their next meeting, a mother-daughter birthday meal at the Plaza Hotel. A.J. tells Meadow about their mother's visits to Furio; he does not understand what they imply, but she does. Tony asks her to treat her mother more gently.

Later, Tony asks Carmela if seeing Meadow mature into an independent woman is not all she ever wanted. She stares at a wall and answers in an emotionless tone of voice, "Yes."

First appearance
 Finn DeTrolio: Meadow's new boyfriend, who is looking to go to dental school.

Deceased
 Minn Matrone: suffocated by Paulie Walnuts after he attempted to steal her money and she caught him in the act.

Final appearance
 Furio Giunta: a DiMeo crime family soldier imported from Annalisa Zucca's Camorra family in Italy. Furio is only mentioned in future episodes.

Title reference
 The title refers to the portrait Eloise at the Plaza Hotel, which is based on the books of the same name. Carmela and Meadow have a tradition, mentioned in the pilot episode, of eating lunch while seated in front of this painting.

References to other media and events
 There is a poster for Topdog/Underdog, the 2002 Pulitzer Prize winning play by Suzan-Lori Parks, hanging in Meadow's new apartment.
 As Meadow mentions going on a ski trip with her friends, Carmela warns her to be careful, and to remember what happened to Sonny Bono. Singer, actor, and politician Bono died in a skiing accident in January 1998.
 The Soprano family and Meadow's friends discuss the Herman Melville novel Billy Budd and whether or not a homosexual subtext can be found in it.
 A.J. reads Thomas Mann's novella Death in Venice.
 A.J. wears a Primal Scream Xtrmntr T-shirt whilst talking to Meadow in his bedroom.
 There is a poster of American industrial metal band Fear Factory hanging in A.J.'s room, which can be seen when Meadow comes to talk to him about their mother.
 Near the end of the episode, Carmela watches a film, How to Marry a Millionaire, on TV.
 Furio wears a S.S.C. Napoli shirt and tracksuit when he goes to the Sopranos' house to pick up Tony.
 Meadow addresses her mother as "Mrs. Danvers" when Carmela makes a comment about her physical relationship with Finn.

Production
During filming for this episode lead actor James Gandolfini absconded from the production for four days, causing the shooting of Furio's final appearance at Westchester County Airport to be rescheduled.

Music
 The song played during the Soprano family's visit to Meadow in New York is "New Slang" by The Shins.
 The song played in the background of a scene between Silvio and Paulie is Metallica's cover of "The Small Hours" by Holocaust.
 The song played at the Bada Bing office when Paulie gives Tony a large envelope of cash (after the murder and robbery of Minn Matrone) is "Real Fonky Time" by Dax Riders.
 The song played over the end credits is "Little Bird" (Live version) by Annie Lennox.
 The harp music playing in the background as Carmela and Meadow eat lunch is from the first movement of the Harp Concerto in B Flat Major, HWV 294 by Georg Friedrich Handel.
 The song played during the wedding reception Paulie talks to Carmine is "Tropico Main Theme Los Parranderos" by Daniel Indart.

References

External links
 "Eloise"  at HBO
 

The Sopranos (season 4) episodes
2002 American television episodes
Television episodes written by Terence Winter